Johanna Konta was the defending champion, but lost in the fourth round to Venus Williams.

Sloane Stephens won the title, defeating Jeļena Ostapenko in the final, 7–6(7–5), 6–1. It was Stephens' sixth career singles title, first Premier Mandatory title, and first title since winning the US Open back in September. By virtue of her victory, Stephens also made her debut in the Top 10, at No. 9.

Danielle Collins became the first qualifier in Miami Open history to reach the semifinals. She defeated Venus Williams in the quarterfinals.

Seeds
All seeds received a bye into the second round.

Draw

Finals

Top half

Section 1

Section 2

Section 3

Section 4

Bottom half

Section 5

Section 6

Section 7

Section 8

Qualifying

Seeds

Qualifiers

Lucky loser

Qualifying draw

First qualifier

Second qualifier

Third qualifier

Fourth qualifier

Fifth qualifier

Sixth qualifier

Seventh qualifier

Eighth qualifier

Ninth qualifier

Tenth qualifier

Eleventh qualifier

Twelfth qualifier

References

External links
 Main Draw
 Qualifying Draw

Women's Singles